Balatonfüredi Futball Club is a professional football club based in Balatonfüred, Veszprém County, Hungary, that competes in the Veszprém county league.

Name changes
1924–?: Balatonfüredi Sport Club
?-1945: Balatonfüredi Levente Egyesület
1945–1947: Balatonfüredi Sport Club
1947–1949: Balatonfüredi Hajózási Munkás Sport Egyesület
1949-1949: Balatonfüredi TIMSE
1949–1951: Balatonfüredi Vasas Hajógyári SK
1951–?: Balatonfüredi Vasas
?-?: MHD Balatonfüred SE
1990–2001: Balatonfüredi SC
2001–present: Balatonfüredi Futball Club

Honours
Nemzeti Bajnokság III:
Winner: 2000–01
Szabadföld Kupa:
Runner-up: 1982

External links
 Profile on Magyar Futball

References

Football clubs in Hungary
Association football clubs established in 1924
1924 establishments in Hungary